Teleghma District is a district of Mila Province, Algeria.

The district is further divided into 3 municipalities:
Teleghma
El Mechira
Oued Seguen

Districts of Mila Province